Terry Bell (1 August 1944 – 15 May 2014) was an English professional footballer who played as a midfielder and forward.

Career
Born in Nottingham, Bell played for Burton Albion, Nottingham Forest, Manchester City, Portsmouth, Nuneaton Borough, Hartlepool United, Reading, Aldershot, Wokingham Town and Hillingdon Borough.

Later life and death
Bell died 15 May 2014, at the age of 69.

References

1944 births
2014 deaths
English footballers
Burton Albion F.C. players
Nottingham Forest F.C. players
Manchester City F.C. players
Portsmouth F.C. players
Nuneaton Borough F.C. players
Hartlepool United F.C. players
Reading F.C. players
Aldershot F.C. players
Wokingham & Emmbrook F.C. players
Hillingdon Borough F.C. players
English Football League players
Association football midfielders
Association football forwards
Wokingham Town F.C. players